John Eddowes Bowman  may refer to:

John Eddowes Bowman the Elder (1785–1841), English banker and naturalist
John Eddowes Bowman the Younger (1819–1854), English chemist